Two Battles of Sabine Pass were fought during the American Civil War:
First Battle of Sabine Pass, September 25, 1862
Second Battle of Sabine Pass, September 8, 1863